Paracombrops is a genus of marine ray-finned fishes from the family Acropomatidae, the lanternbellies or glowbellies. The fish in this genus are found in the Indo-Pacific.

Species
The following species are classified within this genus:

 Parascombrops analis (Katayama, 1957) (Threespine seabass)
 Parascombrops argyreus (Gilbert & Cramer, 1897) 
 Parascombrops glossodon Schwarzhans & Prokofiev, 2017
 Parascombrops madagascariensis Schwarzhans & Prokofiev 2017
 Parascombrops mochizukii Schwarzhans, Prokofiev & Ho, 2017
 Parascombrops nakayamai Schwarzhans & Prokofiev, 2017
 Parascombrops ohei Schwarzhans & Prokofiev, 2017
 Parascombrops parvidens Schwarzhans & Prokofiev, 2017
 Parascombrops pellucidus Alcock, 1889
 Parascombrops philippinensis Günther, 1880 (Sharptooth seabass)
 Parascombrops serratospinosus (H.M. Smith & Radcliffe, 1912) (Roughspine seabass)
 Parascombrops spinosus (Schultz, 1940) (Keelcheek bass)
 Parascombrops yamanouei Schwarzhans, Prokofiev & Ho, 2017

References

 
Acropomatidae